The Sudan People's Liberation Movement-in-Opposition (abbreviated SPLM-IO), also known as the anti-governmental forces (AGF), is a mainly South Sudanese political party and rebel group that split from the Sudan People's Liberation Movement in 2013, due to political tensions between President Salva Kiir and Vice President Riek Machar over leadership of the SPLM. Tensions grew between forces loyal to Kiir and Machar and South Sudan plunged into the South Sudanese Civil War.

The party and militia are led by Riek Machar. Machar also appointed General Simon Gatwech Dual as Army Chief of General Staff, deputized by DCoGS for operations, training, political and moral orientation, logistics, administration and finance. But in June 2021, Machar removed General Gatwech Dual from the position and appointed him into the Presidency as an adviser.  Gatwech however, rejected the new role and fired Machar as leader of the SPLM/A-IO and declared himself interim leader which led to fighting between Machar allies and those loyal to Gen. Gatwech formerly known as the Kit-Gwang faction throughout 2021.

Etymology 
During the Nasir convention in April 2014, the rebels in the South Sudanese Civil War were split on whether to maintain an affiliation with the ruling SPLM party. While Maj. Gen. Garouth Gatkuoth and many generals spoke against a SPLM affiliation, Angelina Teny and much of the leadership were in favor, leading Riek Machar to defer a final decision. The group decided on the provisional name SPLM-SPLA. Shortly after the meeting, however, the media began to call the group the SPLM-in-Opposition, due to its opposition to the governing SPLM party.

Politics 
By May 2018, the SPLM/A-IO had set up a "parallel bush government" in Upper Nile, rivaling the government in Juba. People in rebel-held areas no longer accepted South Sudanese currency which had lost its worth due to hyperinflation, and instead used United States dollars and Ethiopian birr.

The party's ideology (or in some cases, the lack thereof) is essentially identical to the original SPLM, and only differs in the fact that the split between the two was mostly along ethnic lines, with the SPLM-IO representing the same Nuer ethnic group as leader Riek Machar.

In 2018, South Sudanese analyst Duop Chak Wuol questioned SPLM-IO's overall strategy, arguing that the movement's leadership pursued a political solution as part of its efforts to end the civil war without a good plan for its military wing.

Armed wing 

The military forces of the SPLM-IO are known as "Sudan People's Liberation Army-in-Opposition" (abbreviated "SPLA-IO") and consist of deserters from the Sudan People's Liberation Army (SPLA), alongside the private armies of rebel warlords and tribal militias. Those elements of the South Sudanese military that joined the SPLA-IO have done so to protect tribal interests or felt marginalized by the government due to their previous membership in the SSDF. Despite attempts by Machar to attract other ethnic groups to his cause, the SPLA-IO is dominated by Nuer people. Parts of the SPLA-IO are known to recruit child soldiers.

For weapons to fight the South Sudanese civil war, the SPLA-IO used a "shadowy" network of arms dealers, of which little is known other than that most of the gunrunners appeared to be European. A rare exception was the Franco-Polish arms dealer Pierre Dadak who was arrested on 14 July 2016 at his villa in Ibiza. At his villa, the Spanish National Police Corps allege that they found documents showing he was negotiating to sell the SPLA-IO 40,000 AK-47 assault rifles, 30,000 PKM machine guns and 200, 000 boxes of ammunition.

In 2017 SPLA-IO lost the town of Pagak on the Ethiopian border during a government offensive.

Organization 
The SPLA-IO did not have a formal military structure until the Pagak I conference in December 2014, after a year of war. Riek Machar created the following structure:

Simon Gatwich as chief of general staff with the following deputies:

 Maj. Gen. Peter Gadet Yak, operations
 Maj. Gen. Garouth Gatkouth, logistics
 Maj. Gen. Dau Atujong, training
 Maj. Gen. Martin Kenyi, moral orientation
 Maj. Gen. Elias Juda Kulang, administration
 Maj. Gen. Moses Chot Riek, military production
 Maj. Gen. John Both Teny, general headquarters command
 Maj. Gen. Gabriel Tang Gatwich Chan, inspector general.  
Along with the following commands:
 Maj. Gen. James Khor Chuol, Latjor Division 5
 Maj. Gen. Thomas Mabor Dhuo, Phou Division 7
 Maj. Gen. Peter Dor Manjur, Bieh Division 8
 Maj. Gen. Maguek Gai Majak, Lich Division 4
 Maj. Gen. James Koang Chuol, 1st Special Division
 Maj. Gen. Martin Terento Kenyi, Eastern Equatoria
 Maj. Gen. Salem El Haj, Central Equatoria
 Col. Wesley Welba, Mid-Western Equatoria
 Maj. Gen. Dau Aturjong, Northern Bahr el Ghazal
 Maj. Gen. Thomas Basilo Tindo, Western Bahr el Ghazal

See also 
 Nuer White Army
 Sudan People's Liberation Army

External links
Sudan People's Liberation Movement-in-Opposition
Director of Communications, Sudan People's Liberation Movement-in-Opposition

References

Works cited 

 

Factions of the South Sudanese Civil War
Political parties established in 2013
Political parties in South Sudan
Rebel groups in South Sudan
 
2013 establishments in South Sudan